Roesen is a surname. Notable people with the surname include:

Barbara Ann Roesen, married Anne Barton (1933−2013), American-English scholar and Shakespearean critic
Brigitte Roesen (born 1944), German long jumper
Jesper Roesen (born 1975),  Danish taekwondo practitioner
Severin Roesen (1816– after 1872), American painter